Nour El-Semary (born 28 September 1980, in Cairo) is an Egyptian actress and former beauty pageant titleholder.

El-Semary she was the official Pantene Miss Egypt 2003 winner. She represented Egypt in Miss Universe 2003. In 2003 she also acted in the TV Series Al Atar Wa Elsabaa Banat (العطار و السبع بنات) with Nour El-Sherif (نور الشريف).

Nour currently hosts 'The Bollywood Show' on Nogoum FM Largest radio channel in the middle east which is presented in association with MBC Bollywood.

References
https://w

ww.nogoumfm.net/tag/نور-السمري/

1980 births
Living people
Miss Universe 2003 contestants
Egyptian television actresses
Egyptian female models
Models from Cairo
Actresses from Cairo